Janet Karin OAM was born in Perth, Australia in 1938. She became one of Australia's leading dancers in 1956, and has danced with the Victorian Ballet Guild, Borovansky Ballet, and was a founding member of The Australian Ballet. She is a Nationally and Internationally recognised dance educator, and is currently the Head of Artistic Studies and Kinetic Educator for the Australian Ballet School in Melbourne, Australia.

Performance Career, 1956 – 1967 

Karin studied with Laurel Martyn OBE in Melbourne during the 1950s, and was a leading member of the Victorian Ballet Guild where she performed works such as Giselle and Swan Lake. Ballets choreographed by Martyn on her included: Voyager (as Priscilla), Royal Command, and Sylvia.

From 1960–1961 she danced with the Borovansky Ballet in its final season. The Borovansky Ballet was founded in 1940 by Edouard Borovansky.

In 1962 Karin joined an exciting new company founded by Dame Peggy van Praagh known as the Australian Ballet as a soloist. In 1966 she was promoted to the rank of Principal Artist. During her career with the Australian Ballet, she danced many roles including: Debutante in Melbourne Cup, Mazurka in Les Sylphides, the Lilac Fairy in Aurora's Wedding, Myrtha in Giselle, the Second Ballerina in Ballet Imperial and Clytemnestra in Electra.

Training & Development, 1967 – 1987 

In 1967, Karin and her then husband, fellow Principal Artist, Bryan Lawrence left the Australian Ballet and established the Bryan Lawrence School of Ballet in Canberra ACT. The school also had its own performing arm, presenting works such as Coppélia and Giselle to Canberra audiences.

In 1971, Dame Peggy van Praagh, the founding director of the Australian Ballet became patron of the school until her death in 1990.

Artistic Director, 1987 – 1997 

Under Karin's guidance, from 1987, the school became known as the National Capital Ballet School, and the associated performing company became known as the National Capital Dancers. Over the years, Janet commissioned new works from well known choreographers such as: Joe Scoglio, Paul Mercurio, Garth Welch and Natalie Weir.

In 1989, Karin received an Order of Australia Medal for her services to dance, and Noel Pelly AM accepted patronage of the school.

In 1992 and 1993 Robert Ray choreographed Cinderella and A Midsummer Night's Dream for the Dancers, with both productions receiving the Canberra Critics Circle Award; and in 1996, the National Capital Dancers collaborated with the October Ballet Company from Vietnam during their three-month residency in Canberra.

Former students of Janet Karin 

Kylie Hunter-  The Australian Ballet 
 Andrew Baxter – London City Ballet, Vienna Festival Ballet, Hong Kong Ballet.
Andrew Boddington – The Australian Ballet.
Paul Boyd – The Queensland Ballet, Düsseldorf Ballet.
Joshua Consadine – The Australian Ballet.
Danielle Courtier – Expressions Queensland Dance Theatre, D'arc Swan, One Extra
Jane Donko – The Australian Ballet.
Lisa French – One Extra Company.
Lea Francis – Sydney Dance Company, Bangarra Dance Theatre.
Miranda Glickson – The Royal New Zealand Ballet, Singapore Dance Theatre.
Catherine Goss – Sydney Dance Company, Royal New Zealand Ballet.
Paul Hamilton – The Australian Ballet.
Timothy Harbour – The Australian Ballet.
Margrete Helgeby – West Australian Ballet, Chrissie Parrot Dance Company, Rambert Dance Theatre London.
Robert Jackson – Dance Theatre of Ireland.
Victoria Jestyn (Trotter) – Netherlands Dance Theatre, Rambert Dance Company.
Eden Lee – Canterbury Ballet.
Jake Lehrer – Named as most outstanding dancer in Dance Australia March 2003.
Adam Marchant – The Australian Ballet, West Side Story.
Donald Macleod – The Australian Ballet, Bolshoi Ballet, English National Ballet, The Queensland Ballet, The Royal New Zealand Ballet Senior Classical Ballet and Pas de Deux Teacher. New Zealand Ballet School.
Joanne Michel – The Australian Ballet.
Grayson Millwood – Austrian Dance Theatre.
William Mulholland – Victoria State Opera, Australian Contemporary Dance Company, Human Veins, Cats (Melbourne 1988).
Rachael Osborne – Batsheva Dance Company.
Sarah Peace – The Queensland Ballet, The Australian Ballet, Leigh Warren & Dancers
Elizabeth Peck – Welsh Ballet
Francesca Peniguel – Berlin Opera Ballet Company
Annabel Bronner Reid – Royal New Zealand Ballet, The Australian Ballet.
Mardi Roberts – Vienna Volksoper Ballet
David Skelton – K Ballet Japan, Pretoria State Theatre Ballet, Vienna Festival Ballet
Michelle Southwell (Crawley) – Paris Bluebells, Moulin Rouge.
Delia Silvan – Australian Dance Theatre, Leigh Warren & Dancers.
Ross Stretton – The Australian Ballet, Joffrey Ballet, American Ballet Theatre, The Royal Ballet.
Robin Thomas – The Australian Ballet, The Royal New Zealand Ballet.
Sonya Walter – Tasmanian Ballet Company.
Rachel Whitworth – West Australian Ballet.
Sonia Zaluki – Kolobok Character Company.

The National Capital Ballet School and The Karin System 

Based on the Vaganova Syllabus, the Karin System is constantly evolving, in response to developments in understanding of anatomy, learning processes and teaching methodologies and to changes in the artistic and physical requirements of the dance profession.

The Karin System is designed to provide all students with:
Sound technical development. 
Opportunities to develop creativity and self-expression. 
The flexibility to progress at their own rate in a non-competitive environment. 
A broad understanding of dance as an art form.

In 1997, Kylie Hunter (Adv. Dip. KSA) took over the Directorship of the National Capital Ballet School when Janet moved to Melbourne take up a new position at the Australian Ballet.

Recent Activities, 1997 – present 

Karin has developed a number of secondary and tertiary dance education programs, has lectured with the University of Sydney, Australian National University and the University of Melbourne; and has published a number of papers and studies on dance and culture.

Karin is also the President of the International Association of Dance Medicine & Science (IADMS).

In 1997 Janet was appointed as Assistant to the Artistic Director of the Australian Ballet, Ross Stretton until 2001. Currently she is the Head of Artistic Studies and Kinetic Educator at the Australian Ballet School.

Karin is the Patron for the (Laurel Martyn) Movement and Dance Education Centre in Melbourne.

References 
Dictionary of Performing Arts Volume 2: opera, dance, music. Ann Atkinson, Linsay Knight, Margaret McPhee. Allen & Unwin 1996. , 
http://www.natdance.org

http://laurelmartyndance.com

1938 births
Living people
Australian ballerinas